The Netherlands Cancer Institute (NKI) in Amsterdam was founded in 1913 by, among others, the surgeon Jacob Rotgans.
The NKI, together with the Antoni van Leeuwenhoekziekenhuis, is formed into the NKI-AVL, which combines a scientific research institute with a specialized clinic focused on combating the disease cancer. Since 1973 the NKI is located next to the Slotervaartziekenhuis in Amsterdam. NKI is a member of EU-LIFE, an alliance of leading life sciences research centres in Europe.

Core principles of the institute are new methods for diagnostics and treatment. The primary clusters of the NKI-AVL are: Research, Surgical Oncological Disciplines, Medical Oncological Disciplines, Radiotherapy and Diagnostic Oncological Disciplines.

At the start of the 1990s, the NKI, together with the VU University Amsterdam created the Research School for Oncology Amsterdam (OOA) for postdoctoral research and schooling. This research school was accredited by the Royal Netherlands Academy of Arts and Sciences in 1993.

In 2020, scientists at the Institute published observations which have indicated the possibility of a new human organ, a salivary gland, the first such description of a new organ in three hundred years.

Notable employees 
 Denise P. Barlow
 René Bernards
 Agathe L. van Beverwijk
 Piet Borst
Gordon McVie (1980s)
 Laura van't Veer
 Karin E. de Visser

References

External links

NKI (Netherlands Cancer Institute)
 Historad. Over 100 jaar radiotherapie in Nederland, 1913-2013

Amsterdam Nieuw-West
Medical and health organisations based in the Netherlands
Scientific institutes in the Netherlands
Cancer organizations